Phanuel is the name given to the fourth angel who stands before God in the Book of Enoch (ca. 300 BC), after the angels Michael, Raphael, and Gabriel. Other spellings of Phanuel ( or פְּנִיאֵל Pənūʾēl/Pənīʾēl, Tiberian: Pănūʾēl/Pănīʾēl) include Panuel, Paniel, Peniel, Penuel, Fanuel and Feniel. As Panuel his name means "God has turned", but as Paniel his name means "God is my face".

Narrative
Phanuel was one of the four voices Enoch heard praising God.

Interpretations
As an angel, Phanuel is reputedly a member of the four Angels of Presence. In 1st Enoch, he is also listed as an angel of exorcism (he is heard "expelling Satans"). Phanuel has also been linked with the Angel of Penance mentioned in the Shepherd of Hermas.

Some associate Phanuel with Uriel; although some others see this as debatable. Phanuel's duties include bearing up God's throne, ministering Truth, and serving as an angel of judgement. According to The Book of Enoch, Phanuel is the fourth angel "set over repentance and those who hope to inherit eternal life" [Enoch, Chapter 40:9]. He is the fourth voice heard [Enoch, Chapter 40:7] "fending off the Satans (adversaries or accusers) and forbidding them to come before the Lord of spirits to accuse them who dwell on the earth".

See also
 List of angels in theology

References

Bibliography
 Bunson, Matthew (ed.) (1996). Phanuel Angels A to Z New York. Three Rivers Press.
 Lumpkin, Joseph B (ed.) (2004). The Lost Book of Enoch: A Comprehensive Transliteration of the Forgotten Book of the Bible. Fifth Estate Publishers

Angels of the Presence
Archangels
Angels in the Book of Enoch